Nice Guy Eddie is a British television detective drama series, created by Elliot Hope and Johanne McAndrew, and principally written by the latter, which was first broadcast on BBC1 on 14 June 2001, in the form of a 90-minute pilot. Later commissioned into a six-part series, Nice Guy Eddie follows the exploit of a Liverpool-based bumbling private detective, Eddie McMullen, played by Ricky Tomlinson, whose life is turned upside down by the arrival of Frank Bennett (Tom Ellis), who turns up on his doorstep claiming to be his son.

Notably, the role of Eddie McMullen was written specifically for Tomlinson, becoming his first leading role in a television drama series. For the series, a real life private investigator based in Liverpool, Tony Smith, acted as a script consultant, to ensure the stories were as close to life as possible. Despite attracting moderate ratings, only seven episodes (including the pilot) were produced; subsequently, the BBC decided against recommissioning the show for a second series. The series has yet to be released on DVD.

Cast
 Ricky Tomlinson as Eddie McMullen 
 Tom Ellis as Frank Bennett
 Rachel Davies as Ronnie McMullen 
 Elizabeth Spriggs as Vera McMullen 
 John Henshaw as Lol O'Toole 
 Christine Tremarco as Ange McMullen 
 Emma Lucy Vaudrey as Becca McMullen 
 Stephanie Waring as Laura McMullen 
 Joanne Sherryden as Sharon McLean
 Scot Williams as Neil Jones

Episodes

Pilot (2001)

Series (2002)

References

External links

BBC television dramas
2001 British television series debuts
2002 British television series endings
2000s British drama television series
English-language television shows
Television shows shot in Liverpool